Risia Bazar is a town and a nagar panchayat in Bahraich district in the Indian state of Uttar Pradesh.

Demographics
 India census, Risia Bazar had a population of 11,128. Males constitute 52% of the population and females 48%. Risia Bazar has an average literacy rate of 43%, lower than the national average of 59.5%: male literacy is 49%, and female literacy is 36%. In Risia Bazar, 19% of the population is under 6 years of age.

References

Cities and towns in Bahraich district